Damage is a live recording by David Sylvian and Robert Fripp. It was recorded on the "Road to Graceland" tour at London's Royal Albert Hall, December 1993.

This album, originally mixed by Fripp, was first released in 1994 as a limited edition box set: a 24-carat gold CD and 32-page colour booklet in a jewel box inside a cardboard slipcase. It was remixed by David Sylvian and re-released in standard jewel case packaging with different artwork on 10 September 2001.

The song "Darshan: The Road to Graceland" was replaced by "Jean the Birdman" on the reissued version as Sylvian  believed that this track would fit in better with the rest, and the track order was slightly changed.

Background 
The songs "Damage" and "The First Day" were only released on this album, and no studio versions were ever released. "Blinding Light of Heaven", however, has a studio version on the limited edition third disc of Sylvian's compilation Everything and Nothing.

Reception

Paul Stump, in his 1997 History of Progressive Rock, called Damage: Live "a wonder of elegiac splendour."

Track listing 
1994 release
"Damage" (Robert Fripp, Trey Gunn, David Sylvian) – 4:31 
"God's Monkey" (David Bottrill, Fripp, Gunn, Sylvian) – 6:42 
"Brightness Falls" (Fripp, Gunn, Sylvian) – 6:29 
"Every Colour You Are"  (Richard Barbieri, Steve Jansen, Mick Karn, Sylvian) – 5:40 
"Firepower" (Fripp, Gunn, Sylvian) – 7:02 
"Gone to Earth" (Fripp, Sylvian) – 2:28 
"20th Century Dreaming (A Shaman's Song)" (Fripp, Gunn, Sylvian) – 8:03 
"Wave" (Sylvian) – 6:11 
"River Man" (Sylvian) – 5:01 
"Darshan (The Road to Graceland)" (Bottrill, Fripp, Gunn, Sylvian) – 10:47 
"Blinding Light of Heaven" (Fripp, Gunn, Sylvian) – 4:15 
"The First Day" (Fripp, Gunn, Sylvian) – 4:44

2001 re-release
 "God's Monkey" (Sylvian, Fripp, Gunn, Botrill) – 6:39
 "Brightness Falls"  (Sylvian, Fripp, Gunn) – 6:29
 "Every Colour You Are" (Sylvian, Karn, Jansen, Barbieri) – 5:44
 "Jean the Birdman"  (Sylvian, Fripp, Gunn) – 4:03
 "Firepower"  (Sylvian, Fripp, Gunn) – 7:09
 "Damage" (Sylvian, Fripp, Gunn) – 4:26
 "Gone to Earth"  (Sylvian, Fripp) – 2:29
 "Twentieth Century Dreaming (A Shaman's Song)"  (Sylvian, Fripp, Gunn) – 7:54
 "Wave"  (Sylvian) – 6:17
 "River Man"  (Sylvian) – 4:58
 "Blinding Light of Heaven"  (Sylvian, Fripp, Gunn) – 4:36
 "The First Day" (Sylvian, Fripp, Gunn) – 5:22

Personnel
David Sylvian – Vocals, Guitar, Keyboard instruments, tapes
Robert Fripp – Guitar, Frippertronics
Trey Gunn – Chapman Stick, Vocals
Michael Brook – Infinite Guitar
Pat Mastelotto – Drums

Staff
David Kent - sound engineer
David Bottrill - mixing
David Singleton - digital editing, assistant producer
Stuart White - keyboard and recording technician
Alan Pollard - keyboard and recording technician (U.K. and Europe)
Steve Flewin - monitor engineer
John Sinks - guitar technician
Clint Lockyer - stick/drum technician
Dave Newton - stage manager, keyboard/guitar technician
Haruki Kaito - light and stage design
Phil Wiffen - light operator
Tim Hook - tour manager

visual staff
David Sylvian - art director
Yuka Fuji - art director, visual projects co-ordinator
Russell Mills - design
Michael Webster - design assistance
Masataka Nakano - artwork
Shinro Ohtake - artwork (details)
Kevin Westenburg - photography (live)

References

External links 
David Sylvian's discography - albums

Robert Fripp albums
1994 live albums
Collaborative albums
Albums produced by Robert Fripp
Albums produced by David Bottrill
David Sylvian live albums
Virgin Records live albums